Vicente Ten Oliver (born 19 April 1966) is a Spanish politician. He was elected in the 2015 general election to the Congress of Deputies for the electoral district of Valencia for the Citizens party.

In July 2015 Ten was elected as the number one the list for the Citizens party for the electoral district of Valencia. He received 455 votes while his opponent, Vicente Raga, received 366.

References

1966 births
Citizens (Spanish political party) politicians
Living people
Members of the 11th Congress of Deputies (Spain)
Members of the 12th Congress of Deputies (Spain)
Members of the 13th Congress of Deputies (Spain)